Alfred-Kunze-Sportpark is a multi-use stadium in Leipzig, Germany. It is used as the stadium of BSG Chemie Leipzig matches. The capacity of the stadium is 4,999 spectators.

For the inaugural season of the new European League of Football the Leipzig Kings played their home games at the stadium. They had to move out for the 2022 season due to noise regulations.

References

External links
 Stadium history
 Venue information and photos

Football venues in Germany
Leipzig Kings
Sport in Leipzig
Buildings and structures in Leipzig
Sports venues in Saxony
BSG Chemie Leipzig (1950)
European League of Football venues